Rose Gold is the debut studio album by South African singer-songwriter Shekhinah. It was released by Sony Music Entertainment Africa on October 6, 2017. Rose Gold was certified gold by the Recording Industry of South Africa on January 24, 2018 and later certified platinum on August 31, 2018. The album features guest appearances from South African rapper, Rouge, Asali and Jamali band member, Mariechan. Production is handled by David Scott, DJ Maphorisa, Mae N. Maejor, Shekhinah and Luke Goliath.

Singles
The album's promotional single, "Suited" was released on 19 July 2017. Produced by South African record producer and recording artist DJ Maphorisa, the song was certified Platinum by RiSA on 24 January 2018. Sony Music announced on 5 April that the single reached Diamond status.

Shekhinah speaking on the song: 

The music video for the single was released on Shekhinah's Vevo account on 17 August 2017. It was directed by Nate Thomas and has garnered over 3.2 million views on YouTube.

The second single "Please Mr." was released on 9 February 2018. Sony Music later announced on 29 March that the song was certified Gold.

Track listing
Credits adapted from Tidal.

Release history

Certifications

References

2017 debut albums
Shekhinah (singer) albums
Albums produced by DJ Maphorisa